A list of people who have served as Lord-Lieutenant of Antrim, located in Northern Ireland.

There were lieutenants of counties in Ireland until the reign of James II, when they were renamed governors. The office of Lord Lieutenant was recreated on 23 August 1831.

Lord-Lieutenants
 Randal MacDonnell, 1st Earl of Antrim: 1620–1636(died 1636)
 Alexander MacDonnell, 3rd Earl of Antrim 1685–89 (died 1699)

Governors

 Alexander MacDonnell, 5th Earl of Antrim (died 1775)
 Randal William MacDonnell, 1st Marquess of Antrim –1801 (died 1801)
 George Chichester, 2nd Marquess of Donegall: –1831 
 Charles O'Neill, 1st Earl O'Neill: –1831

Lord-Lieutenants
The 1st Earl O'Neill: 17 October 1831 – 25 March 1841
The 3rd Marquess of Donegall: 24 April 1841 – 20 October 1883
The 1st Baron Waveney: 4 December 1883 – 15 February 1886
Sir Edward Porter Cowan: 2 April 1886 – 24 March 1890
Sir Francis Workman-Macnaghten, 3rd Bt.: 21 May 1890 – 21 July 1911
The 9th Earl of Shaftesbury: 2 November 1911 – 1916
The 12th Viscount Massereene: 9 June 1916 – 1938
The 3rd Baron O'Neill: 14 April 1938 – 24 October 1944
Senator James Graham Leslie: 12 March 1945 – 16 May 1949
The 1st Baron Rathcavan: 22 September 1949 – 1959
Sir Richard Dobbs: 24 March 1959 – 1994
The 4th Baron O'Neill: 19 April 1994 – 31 August 2008
Joan Christie: 1 September 2008 – 28 June 2019
David McCorkell: 29 June 2019 –

See also
Lists of Lord Lieutenancies

Official Antrim Lieutenancy Website

References

 
People from County Antrim
Politics of County Antrim
Antrim